This is a list of Iranian football transfers for the 2018–19 winter transfer window. Only transfers involving a team from the professional divisions are listed, including the 16 teams in the 2018–19 Persian Gulf Pro League and the 18 teams playing in the 2018–19 Azadegan League.

The winter transfer window opens on 6 January 2019, although a few transfers may take place prior to that date. The window closes at midnight on 3 February 2019 although outgoing transfers might still happen to leagues in which the window is still open. Players without a club may join teams, either during or in between transfer windows.

Iran Pro League

Esteghlal

In

Out

Esteghlal Khuzestan

In

Out

Foolad

In

Out

Machine Sazi

In

Out

Naft Masjed-Soleyman

In

Out

Nassaji

In

Out

Padideh

In

Out

Pars Jonoubi Jam

In

Out

Paykan

In

Out

Persepolis

In

Out

Saipa

In

Out

Sanat Naft

In

Out

Sepahan

In

Out

Sepidrood

In

Out

Tractor Sazi

In

Out

Zob Ahan

In

Out

Notes and references

Football transfers winter 2018–19
2018–19
Transfers